Vignate is a comune (municipality) in the Metropolitan City of Milan in the Italian region Lombardy, located about  east of Milan.

Vignate borders the following municipalities: Cernusco sul Naviglio, Cassina de' Pecchi, Melzo, Rodano, Liscate, and Settala.

It is served by Vignate railway station.

Twin towns
Vignate is twinned with:

  Gières, France, since 1984

References

External links
 Official website

Cities and towns in Lombardy